Ramulus lobulatus is a species of phasmid or stick insect. It is found in Sri Lanka.

References

Phasmatodea
Insects of Sri Lanka
Endemic fauna of Sri Lanka
Insects described in 1907
Taxa named by Carl Brunner von Wattenwyl